Intritenda is a genus of moths belonging to the subfamily Tortricinae of the family Tortricidae. It consists of only one species, Intritenda tridentina, which is found in Ecuador (Loja Province).

The wingspan is about 18,5 mm. The ground colour of the forewings is leaden grey, but cream grey beyond the end of the median cell and subterminally. The hindwings are whitish cream with greyish spots.

Etymology
The generic name is an anagram of the name of the type-species. The specific name refers to the triple prominences of the processes of some parts of the male genitalia.

See also
List of Tortricidae genera

References

Euliini